Peter Raabe (27 November 1872 – 12 April 1945) was a German composer and conductor.

Biography

Raabe graduated from 3 schools: the Higher Musical School in Berlin; and the universities of Munich; and Jena. In 1894–98 Raabe worked in Königsberg and Zwickau. In 1899–1903 he worked in the Dutch Opera-House (Amsterdam). In 1907–1920, Raabe was the 1st Court Conductor in Weimar. Raabe performed in the United Kingdom, Belgium, and the Netherlands, among other locations. On 19 July 1935 Raabe superseded Richard Strauss as the president of Reichsmusikkammer, the Nazi State Music Institute. For almost ten years, Raabe directed the music activity of the Third Reich. 

Raabe wrote the first complete chronology of the works of Franz Liszt.

References 
 Who Was Who in the Third Reich. Biographic encyclopedical dictionary, Moscow, 2003

External links
 

1872 births
1945 deaths
German conductors (music)
German male conductors (music)
Officials of Nazi Germany
People from Frankfurt (Oder)
People from the Province of Brandenburg